Jackson Anderson (born October 5, 1989) is former American football long snapper. He played college football at Duke.

Professional career

Houston Texans
The Houston Texans invited Anderson to their 2013 rookie minicamp on a tryout basis. He was not offered a contract at the conclusion of the minicamp.

Dallas Cowboys
On May 29, 2013, Anderson was signed by the Dallas Cowboys as an undrafted free agent. On August 11, 2013, he was waived by the Cowboys.

References

External links
Duke Blue Devils bio
Dallas Cowboys bio

Living people
1989 births
Duke Blue Devils football players
Dallas Cowboys players
Players of American football from Texas
People from Frisco, Texas